Pedro Antonio Rentería González (born 29 April 1991) is a Mexican footballer who plays as a midfielder for Sinaloa.

References

Mexican footballers
1991 births
Living people
Association football midfielders
Footballers from Sinaloa
Sportspeople from Culiacán
Murciélagos FC footballers
Dorados de Sinaloa footballers